Arnold Ludwig Mendelssohn (26 December 1855 – 18 February 1933), was a German composer and music teacher.

He was born in Ratibor, Province of Silesia; the son of Felix Mendelssohn's cousin Wilhelm Mendelssohn (1821–1866) who, in 1854, had married Louise Aimee Cauer (sister to Bertha Cauer). In 1885, Arnold Ludwig himself married his second cousin, Maria Cauer, daughter of Karl Cauer (sister of Ludwig Cauer).

Mendelssohn was originally a lawyer before studying music, then was director of church music and a professor in Darmstadt. Paul Hindemith was one of his students. After his death his works were banned in Nazi Germany because of his Jewish heritage. He died in Darmstadt.

Works, editions and recordings
Mendelssohn composed chorale cantatas, three operas, and other works.

Operas 
Elsi, die seltsame Magd (op. 8), Oper in 2 Aufzügen. Libretto: Hermann Wette; premier 16 April 1896 Stadttheater Köln
Der Bärenhäuter (op. 11), Oper in 3 Acts. Libretto: Hermann Wette; premiere 9 February 1900 Theater des Westens in Berlin
Die Minneburg (1904–07), Oper in einem Akt. Libretto: G. von Koch; premiere 1909 in Mannheim

Solo Piano Music 
 Moderne Suite for Piano Op. 79 (1918)
 Sonata for Piano in e minor Op. 66 (1917)

Chamber music 
 String Quartet No.2 in d minor Op.67 (1915)
 Sonata for Violoncello and Piano in f-sharp minor Op. 70 (1917)
 Sonata for Violin and Piano in C Major Op.71 (1917)
 Trio for 2 Violins & Piano in a minor Op. 76 (1918)

Wind Band 
Suite for Woodwinds, Brass and Percussion Op. 62 (1916)

Selected recordings
Deutsche Messe op.89 SWR Vokalensemble Stuttgart, Frieder Bernius. Hanssler.
Geistliche Chormusik op.90,  Berliner Vokalensemble, Bernd Stegmann. Cantate.

References

External links

Trio for 2 Violins & Piano, Op.76 sound-bites & discussion of work



1855 births
1933 deaths
19th-century classical composers
19th-century German composers
19th-century German male musicians
20th-century classical composers
20th-century German composers
20th-century German male musicians
German male classical composers
German opera composers
German Romantic composers
Jewish classical composers
Jewish opera composers
Male opera composers
Arnold
People from Racibórz
People from the Province of Silesia
Silesian Jews